Bỉm Sơn is a district-level town (thị xã) of Thanh Hóa province in the North Central Coast region of Vietnam. As of 2003 the district had a population of 54,084. The district covers an area of 67 km². The district capital lies at Bỉm Sơn.

References
 Bỉm Sơn Town

Populated places in Thanh Hóa province
Districts of Thanh Hóa province
County-level towns in Vietnam